Premake is an open-source software development utility for automatically building configuration from source code.

Features 
Some of Premake's features are:

 It supports the C, C++, and C# programming languages.
 Its syntax is simple.
 It can generate automatic build files for Visual Studio, GNU Make, Xcode, Code::Blocks, CodeLite, SharpDevelop, and MonoDevelop.
 Using just one configuration set of files, different systems can be built.

Sample script 
The following is an example Premake script for a simple software project.

solution "MySolution"
  configurations { "Debug", "Release" }

project "MyProject"
  kind "ConsoleApp"
  language "C++"
  includedirs { "include" }
  files { "src/**.h", "src/**.cpp" }

  configuration "Debug"
    symbols "On"
    defines { "_DEBUG" }

  configuration "Release"
    flags { "Optimize" }
    defines { "NDEBUG" }

Notable uses 
Projects that use Premake include:
 0 A.D.
 Box2D
 Bullet
 GpuCV
 Open Dynamics Engine
 OpenJAUS
 VDrift

See also 
 
 configure script
 CMake
 GYP

References

External links 
 
 
 
 
 

Build automation
Compiling tools
Free software programmed in C
Lua (programming language)-scriptable software
Software using the BSD license
Unix package management-related software